2012 World Series Hockey better known as Bridgestone World Series Hockey, abbreviated as Bridgestone WSH, was the first season of the hockey tournament World Series Hockey, a professional league for field hockey in India. The tournament was to take place from 17 December 2011 to 22 January 2012 but later was postponed to 29 February 2012 owing to Olympic qualifiers. Eight teams took part in this competition. The opening ceremony and the first match was held at Sector 42 Stadium, Chandigarh, where Bhopal Badshahs beat Chandigarh Comets 4–3.

The inaugural season of the WSH was won by Sher-e-Punjab by defeating Pune Strykers 5–2 in the final at Mahindra Hockey Stadium, Mumbai and thus became the first champions of WSH. Chandigarh Comets' drag-flicker Gurjinder Singh was named WSH Rockstar (Player of the tournament) (19 goals in 15 matches) who also shared the golden stick with Pakistan's Syed Imran Warsi for 19 goals apiece.

Venues
Following eight venues will host the matches of eight franchises on a home and away basis: Delhi, Mumbai, Pune, Bhopal, Jalandhar, Chandigarh, Bangalore and Chennai will host the matches of eight franchises on a home and away basis.
Dhyan Chand National Stadium, Delhi
Bangalore Hockey Stadium, Bangalore
Mayor Radhakrishnan Stadium, Chennai
PCMC Hockey Stadium, Shree Shiv Chhatrapati Sports Complex, Pune
Mahindra Hockey Stadium, Mumbai
Sector 42 Stadium, Chandigarh
Surjeet Hockey Stadium, Jalandhar
Aishbagh Stadium, Bhopal
Originally, nine venues were selected and upgraded with floodlights, replay screens, and scoreboards but organisers decided not to have any matches in Hyderabad's Gachibowli Hockey Stadium.

Players

The players for the eight teams were finalized on 28 November based on the draft system.

Umpires

Exhibition match

An exhibition match was organised on 20 December at Sector 42 Stadium, Chandigarh. Match was played between WSH World XI and WSH India XI. A one-sided match from the start was won by World XI. The World XI was captained by Brent Livermore and coached by José Brasa and Andrew Meredith. Prabhjot Singh led the India XI and coached by Jude Felix and Harendra Singh.

Match timings according to Indian Standard Time (UTC +05:30)

Opening ceremony
Opening ceremony of Bridgestone World Series Hockey was held at Sector 42 Stadium of Chandigarh followed by the inaugural match between Chandigarh Comets and Bhopal Badshahs.

League progression

Results
All matches' timings according to Indian Standard Time (UTC+05:30)

League Phase

Play-offs

Semifinals

Final

The final of World Series Hockey was held in front of the capacity crowd at the Mahindra Hockey Stadium, Mumbai. Pune Strykers got into early lead when Tyron Pereira's cross creeped in during the 4th minute of the game. Pune's joy was short-lived as V.S. Vinaya neutralized off their first penalty corner a minute later. Prabhjot Singh and Deepak Thakur led Punjab's attacks and were awarded with couple of penalty corners but could not be converted. Few close shots were saved by the goal-keeper Gurpreet Guri Singh. Attacks on the other end were made by Argentine recruit Mario Almada, Roshan Minz, Nikkin Thimmiah and Bikash Topo. Second quarter seemed like taking a goalless path before Deepak Thakur broke the deadlock between the sides by slotting in off a reverse stick just before the half time and Punjab saw themselves riding on a slender lead (2–1).

The first half saw an evenly contested match but the second half was completely dominated by Punjab. Skipper Prabhjot Singh in the 47th minute gave Punjab a two-goal cushion with a reverse-stick over Pune before the end off the third quarter. Sher-e-Punjab continued the tempo in the 4th quarter with Punjab's penalty-corner specialist Harpeet Singh converted off a penalty corner with a drag-flick. Known as the comeback kings, Strykers' all efforts were prevented by some robust defending by Punjab. A solo effort by the Prabhjot put Punjab into an unassailable 5–1 lead with four minutes left, who added 10th goal to his season's tally, and confirmed that his team as the champions. Simrandeep Randhawa added a consolation goal to Pune's tally by converting a penalty corner in the last minute and the match ended with Sher-e-Jalandhar 5, Pune Strykers 2 making Sher-e-Punjab the winners of the first WSH.

Awards

Statistics

Leading goalscorers

Hat-tricks

4 Player scored 4 goals

See also
 World Series Hockey

References

2012
2012 in field hockey
2012 in Indian sport